Bryan Williams may refer to:

Bryan Williams (English footballer) (born 1927), English footballer
Bryan Williams (rugby union) (born 1950), former New Zealand rugby union footballer and coach
Birdman (rapper) (born 1969), record executive, record producer, and rapper whose real name is Bryan Williams
Bryan Williams (American football) (born 1987), NFL and AFL football player
Bryan C. Williams, member of the Ohio Board of Education, and former member of the Ohio House of Representatives
Bryan Williams (professor) (born 1949), molecular biologist
Bryan Williams (Canadian lawyer), Canadian lawyer and judge
Bryan Williams (priest) (1936–2005), Welsh Anglican priest
David William (Bryan David Williams, 1926–2010), British/Canadian actor and artistic director

See also
Brian Williams (disambiguation)